Balkh Cricket Stadium is a cricket stadium in Mazar-i-Sharif, Afghanistan. It is currently under construction with financial assistance from USAID and India.

The stadium is able to host international teams to play in Afghanistan, which became full member of ICC in 2017.

References

Cricket grounds in Afghanistan
Buildings and structures in Afghanistan
Mazar-i-Sharif